is a railway station in the city of Kasugai, Aichi Prefecture, Japan, operated by Central Japan Railway Company (JR Tōkai). It is also a freight depot for the Japan Freight Railway Company (JR Freight).

Lines
Kasugai Station is served by the Chūō Main Line, and is located 378.8 kilometers from the starting point of the line at Tokyo Station and 18.1 kilometers from Nagoya Station.

Station layout
The station has one side platform and one island platforms connected by an elevated station building. The station building has automated ticket machines, TOICA automated turnstiles and a staffed ticket office.

Platforms

Adjacent stations

|-
!colspan=5|JR Central

Station history
It was renamed to its present name on May 1, 1946. Along with the division and privatization of JNR on April 1, 1987, the station came under the control and operation of the Central Japan Railway Company. A new station building was completed in 2016.

Passenger statistics
In fiscal 2017, the station was used by an average of 15,818 passengers daily (arriving passengers only).

Surrounding area
Kasugai City Hall
site of Jōjō Castle

See also
 List of Railway Stations in Japan

References

External links

official home page

Railway stations in Japan opened in 1927
Railway stations in Aichi Prefecture
Chūō Main Line
Stations of Central Japan Railway Company
Kasugai, Aichi
Stations of Japan Freight Railway Company